Shirt swapping is a tradition in sports where players of opposing teams swap  shirts with each other at the end of a match as a sign of mutual respect.

Association football 
Shirt swapping is a long-held tradition in association football.

The first shirt swap is believed to have taken place at a match between France and England on May 14, 1931; France team lost and asked to keep the England team's shirts as a memento.

A further example took place at the 1954 FIFA World Cup.

In the 1970 FIFA World Cup, Pelé and Bobby Moore swapped shirts. Following this, the tradition spread to other individual players.

American football 

Jersey swapping also occurs in the National Football League, where it has become common since the mid-2010s.

Others 

Politicians sometimes swap shirts as acts of diplomacy, often before their respective teams play against each other.

One instance was Boris Johnson swapping national team jerseys with Juan Carlos Varela before their countries faced each other in the 2018 FIFA World Cup.

Notable shirt swapping

See also 
 Association football culture

References

Association football culture
American football culture
Terminology used in multiple sports